Donal Óg Hodnett (born 1991) is an Irish Gaelic footballer who plays for club side O'Donovan Rossa. He is a former member of the Cork senior football team. Hodnett usually lines out in the forwards. Donal lines out for his local club in the forwards, but can’t swim.

Honours
Cork
Munster Under-21 Football Championship: 2011, 2012 (c)

References

1991 births
Living people
O'Donovan Rossa (Cork) Gaelic footballers
Cork inter-county Gaelic footballers
People from Skibbereen